The Blue River is a  stream that runs through the Apache-Sitgreaves National Forest in Arizona. It arises near Alpine and flows south into the San Francisco River just upstream from Clifton.

Fish species 
 Rainbow
 Brown
 Channel Catfish

See also
 List of rivers of Arizona

References

Sources

Footnotes

External links 
 GORP Article on the Blue River
 Arizona Boating Locations Facilities Map
 Arizona Fishing Locations Map

White Mountains (Arizona)
Rivers of Arizona
Rivers of Apache County, Arizona
Rivers of Greenlee County, Arizona
Apache-Sitgreaves National Forests